Michiwa Kuduchi (Japanese: 道輪口説, Michiwa kuduchi) is a Ryukyuan folk song from Okinawa Prefecture, Japan. Its formal name is "Michiwa Kuduchi". When the song is accompanied by a dance, it's referred to as "Aki no Odori" (秋の踊り). 

Aki no Odori is relatively younger than most Ryukyuan folk music, which is why its lyrics are in Japanese rather than in one of the Ryukyuan languages.

Lyrics

See also 

 Ryukyuan music
 Okinawan music
 Sanshin

Notes
a.There are numerous variations of the sixth verse. The word "onoko" is often replaced with "kodomo", "koromo", etc.

References 

Ryukyuan music
Okinawan music
Folk songs
Ryukyuan folk songs